Lysine-specific demethylase 4D is an enzyme that in humans is encoded by the KDM4D gene. KDM4D belongs to the alpha-ketoglutarate-dependent hydroxylase superfamily.

In 2017, messenger RNA from this gene was used in the  experiment that produced the first two cloned primates from post-embryonic donor material. A similar experiment was carried out to increase the cloning efficiency of bovine species in 2018.

References

Further reading 

 
 
 

Human 2OG oxygenases
EC 1.14.11